The 2009 Magny-Cours Superbike World Championship round was the thirteenth round of the 2009 Superbike World Championship season. It took place on the weekend of October 2–4, 2009 at the Circuit de Nevers Magny-Cours.

Results

Superbike race 1 classification

Superbike race 2 classification

Supersport race classification
The Supersport race was red-flagged during the 20th lap, due to an accident occurred to Michele Pirro. The classification was based on the standings after 19 laps.

References
 Superbike Race 1
 Superbike Race 2
 Supersport Race

Magny-Cours Round
Magny-Cours
Magny-Cours Superbike World Championship round